Kanta-Häme, sometimes referred to by the obsolete Tavastia Proper or as the Häme region, is a region ( / ) of Finland. It borders the regions of Southwest Finland, Pirkanmaa, Päijät-Häme, and Uusimaa.

Hämeenlinna is the largest urban area in the region. There are two other municipalities that have township status: Riihimäki and Forssa.

Historical provinces
The region of Kanta-Häme has been inhabited since the Stone Age. The first written mention of the historical Tavastia province is found in the Chronicle Of Novgorod, in reference to a military campaign launched by Prince Vladimir in 1042.  The region had been ruled by the Swedes since the late 13th century, when Birger Jarl led the Second Crusade against the inhabitants of historical Tavastia province. In the 14th century, Häme became a fiefdom, whose administrative seat was Häme Castle. When Finland was taken from Sweden by the Russians in 1809, Tavastia proper also became part of the Russian Empire. Russian rule ended in 1917.

For  more history, geography and culture see: Tavastia (historical province)

Municipalities

The region of Kanta-Häme is made up of 11 municipalities, of which three have city status (marked in bold).

Forssa sub-region:
 Forssa
Population: 
 Humppila
Population: 
 Jokioinen (Jockis)
Population: 
 Tammela
Population: 
 Ypäjä
Population: 

Hämeenlinna sub-region:
 Hattula
Population: 
 Hämeenlinna (Tavastehus)
Population: 
 Janakkala
Population: 

Riihimäki sub-region:
 Hausjärvi
Population: 
 Loppi
Population: 
 Riihimäki
Population:

Heraldry

Kanta-Häme uses the arms of the old historical province Tavastia.

Culture 
Kanta-Häme region is well known for the preserved tradition of brewing sahti.

Politics
Results of the 2019 Finnish parliamentary election in Kanta-Häme:
Social Democratic Party   24.82%
Finns Party   19.72%
National Coalition Party   18.95%
Centre Party   10.41%
Left Alliance   8.81%
Green League   7.99%
Christian Democrats   5.22%
Movement Now   1.58%
Seven Star Movement   0.61%
Blue Reform   0.42%
Swedish People's Party   0.19%
Other parties   1.28%

References

External links

Official Kanta-Häme region website
Visit Häme website of the region (In English)

 
Southern Finland Province
Regions of Finland